Ersi Rural District is in the Central District of Jolfa County, East Azerbaijan province, Iran. At the National Census of 2006, its population was 4,779 in 1,408 households. There were 4,250 inhabitants in 1,408 households at the following census of 2011. At the most recent census of 2016, the population of the rural district was 4,589 in 1,655 households. The largest of its seven villages was Livarjan, with 1,900 people.

References 

Jolfa County

Rural Districts of East Azerbaijan Province

Populated places in East Azerbaijan Province

Populated places in Jolfa County